Song Jia (Chinese:宋佳, born 13 November 1980), also known as Xiao Song Jia (小宋佳, literally: "Song Jia the younger", to distinguish her from another older actress also called Song Jia), is a Chinese actress and singer.

Career
Song Jia studied at the secondary school affiliated with the Shenyang Conservatory of Music (SYCM), and at Shanghai Theater Academy where she majored in acting.

Song rose to fame for her performance in ''Curiosity Kills the Cat'' (2006) as a manicure girl with a clear-cut stand on what to love and what to hate. She was nominated for a Golden Rooster Award for Best Supporting Actress.

Song has been known for her diverse roles as well as her precise and genuine portrayal of every character, winning her acclaim as a versatile actress. She played the role of Zheng Yunan in the television series  Memoirs of China (2008) and a native Tibetan girl in the film Once Upon a Time in Tibet (2010). In both roles, she was able to speak a new language with a natural confidence and fluency: English and Tibetan. These two vastly different yet equally challenging characters are a typical example of her diverse acting style.

In The Brink (2012), Song played the lead female character Gu Qiuyan. Within the limited story structure, Song revealed a multifaceted character and a complex psychological world, and received both the Magnolia and Golden Eagle Awards for Best Actress.
 
In Falling Flowers (2013), Song depicted the legendary life of renowned Chinese writer Xiao Hong, and won the Golden Rooster Award for Best Actress, the Chinese American Film Festival Gold Angel Award for Best Actress and other awards. This film also won the Golden Goblet Award for Best Cinematography at the Shanghai International Film Festival.

For the martial arts film  The Final Master (2015), Song won Best Actress awards from the inaugural Gold Aries Award by the Macau International Film Festival and the Huading Awards for her performance as a sharp-tongued waitress in a fancy Western-themed restaurant, shamed in the community because she gave birth to a son who was not fully Chinese.

In 2017, Song served on the jury for the Shanghai Television Festival.

In 2021, Song  was the jury for the main competition of feature films at the 24th Shanghai International Film Festival

Other activities
Song Jia was appointed the UNEP 10YFP and SWITCH-Asia Ambassador, joining in international efforts to achieve Sustainable Consumption and Production in China.

Filmography

Film

Television series

Discography

Albums

Singles

Awards and nominations

References

External links
 

Actresses from Heilongjiang
Living people
1980 births
Chinese Mandopop singers
Musicians from Harbin
Shanghai Theatre Academy alumni
Chinese film actresses
Chinese television actresses
21st-century Chinese actresses
21st-century Chinese women singers